Canoncito is an unincorporated community in Mora County, New Mexico, United States. It was named due to being located in a small canyon.

References

Unincorporated communities in Mora County, New Mexico
Unincorporated communities in New Mexico